Rhadinopus may refer to:
 Rhadinopus (beetle), a genus of beetles in the family Curculionidae
 Rhadinopus (plant), a genus of plants in the family Rubiaceae